Linda L. Berger is an American lawyer, currently the Family Foundation Professor at William S. Boyd School of Law, University of Nevada, Las Vegas.

References

Year of birth missing (living people)
Living people
University of Nevada, Las Vegas faculty
21st-century American women lawyers
21st-century American lawyers
University of Colorado Boulder alumni
Case Western Reserve University alumni